Masters of Time is a collection of two science fiction novellas by A. E. van Vogt. It was first published in 1950 by Fantasy Press in an edition of 4,034 copies. It contains the unrelated novellas "Recruiting Station" (here retitled "Masters of Time") and "The Changeling". The latter features a recurring character of van Vogt's called Pendrake. Both works of fiction originally appeared in the magazine Astounding SF. More confusingly, the title novella has also appeared on the third title of "Earth's Last Fortress".

Sources

External links 
 

1950 short story collections
Short story collections by A. E. van Vogt
Works originally published in Analog Science Fiction and Fact
Literature about time travel
Fantasy Press books